Fuga da Reuma Park is a 2016 sketch comedy film directed by Aldo, Giovanni & Giacomo and Morgan Bertacca.

Plot
On the Christmas Eve of 2041, Aldo is accompanied by his sons to Reuma Park, an amusement park for elderly people. There, he meets his old friends Giovanni and Giacomo, who are also residents of the park. The three plan to escape from the park during the Christmas holidays and, eventually, manage to do so by stealing a boat and sailing to Brazil.

Cast

References

External links
 

2016 comedy films
Italian comedy films
2010s Italian-language films
2010s Italian films